Baath, Ba'ath or Ba'th may refer to:

Politics
Ba'ath Party
Ba'ath Party (Iraqi-dominated faction)
Arab Socialist Ba'ath Party – Iraq Region
Ba'ath Party (Syrian-dominated faction)
Arab Socialist Ba'ath Party – Syria Region
Arab Socialist Ba'ath Party – Organization of Sudan
Arab Socialist Ba'ath Party – Lebanon Region
Arab Socialist Ba'ath Party – Yemen Region
Libyan Arab Socialist Ba'ath Party
Sudanese Ba'ath Party
Ba'athism
Ba'athist Iraq
De-Ba'athification
Arab Socialist Revolutionary Ba'ath Party
February 1963 Iraqi coup d'état
1963 Syrian coup d'état

Places
Baath Dam
Al-Baath Stadium
Al-Baath University

Other
Albert Ulrik Bååth
A Flood in Baath Country, a Syrian documentary film